Pereira Barreto is a municipality in the state of São Paulo in Brazil. The population is 25,677 (2020 est.) in an area of 974 km². The elevation is 347 m.

References

Municipalities in São Paulo (state)